Shaanxi University of Science & Technology is a university located in Shaanxi province, China.

It has a campus in Xianyang and a campus in Xi'an.

History
Founded in 1958 as Beijing Institute of Light Industry (BJILI), the university was under direct administration of former  and had been the first higher educational institute focusing on light industry since the founding of the People’s Republic of China in 1949. Then in 1970 BJILI was relocated to Xianyang City of Shaanxi Province where it merged with the Preparatory Office of Xianyang College of Light Industry and was granted a new name: Northwest Institute of Light Industry (NWILI). In 1978, NWILI was identified by the State Council as one of the 88 national key universities in China. After twenty years till 1998, NWILI was handed over to local provincial government from the central ministry and was incorporated in the system of "co-governance from central and provincial government with local governance as main part". Approved by the Ministry of Education in 2002, NWILI was named Shaanxi University of Science & Technology (SUST). After 2004, SUST opened a new campus in Xi'an. Then two years later in 2006, the mainpart of the university moved eastward to Xi'an, the capital city of Shaanxi Province.

Education
[[File:library.jpg]]
Science and Technology[1]

SUST is well known for its light industry education, which includes four national and provincial key disciplines: paper-making engineering, materials engineering, leather-making engineering, and packaging engineering.
For more detailed information, go to the Research page about specific projects and the Academics page, which describes each college.

Paper-making Engineering

In conjunction with the founding of SUST in 1958, the paper-making engineering discipline is “a key discipline of Shaanxi province.” At present, it focuses on the research and development of paper-making technologies. SUST is consistently developing new products, innovating new paper-making processes and achieving “green production” goals. Leading faculty and scientific achievements have made this field a well-known SUST symbol.

Materials Engineering

SUST has received national recognition in connection with materials engineering. In this field, three SUST faculty members have received awards from the National Outstanding Youth Fund and the New Century Talents. In recent years, SUST has been a part of more than 20 national projects, and more than 50 provincial and ministerial and bureau-level projects. Furthermore, SUST has written more than 300 academic and research essays in the field, in which over 60 are indexed by the SCI (Science Citation Index) and the EI (Engineering Index); more than 25 monographic textbooks have been published and 60 achievements have been practically applied, bringing in funding opportunities and prestige.

Leather Chemistry and Engineering

Closely related to the life sciences, a multidisciplinary and dynamic field at SUST, leather production (including fur manufacturing and its variety of functions and uses), research and development are key disciplines at SUST. Upon graduation, students are qualified in manufacturing management, technological design, scientific research, as well as technical supervision in exports.

Packaging Engineering

SUST was the first university in China to implement packaging engineering as a major at both the undergraduate and graduate levels. SUST was also the first to carry out research in CAD packaging and digital packaging. Equipped with flexible facilities and advanced testing center in Northwest China, SUST is acknowledged as the trusted and professional packaging brand in Shaanxi province and throughout the country.

Research
Applied Technologies

SUST attaches a lot of importance on placing its technologies into practical use across a wide range of business disciplines. Specifically, five branches have been most successful in applying their technology in various fields.

Leather and Chemical Engineering

Two -step Cycle of High-exhaustion Leather Panning Production Technology
Leather Waste Extraction and Degradation Gelatin Production Technology
New Washable Chamois Garment Leather and Wipe Leather Production Technology
Goat W et Blue Leather Production Technology with new Water-saving and Low- Pollution features
Utilization of modified Melatin

Materials Engineering

Hydrothermal Synthesis of TiO2 Nano Particles
Hydrothermal ZrSiO4 Nano P articles
High Strength, High White and New Compound Insulator Material
New Green Seepage Brick
Multi-purpose Glass Furnace

Paper-making and Chemical Industry

New High -grade Fruit Paper Production Technology
New High-set strength Paper Pulp Technology
High-strength Water-resistant Packaging Material Manufacturing Processes
Physical Properties of Paper Manufacturing Cardboard
Honeycomb Base Paper Manufacturing Technology

Mechanical and Electrical Engineering

Deflection Coil Winding Machine Closed Loop Tension System
High-speed Precision Intermittent Translocation Cam Gear and CAD / CAM Technology
Short High-speed Pneumatic Grinding Head Overhang
Cam ATC robot Machining Center
Arc Cam Reducer
Food Production
Ms. Champagne-Cider Production Technology
Kiwi Seeds Oil Production Technology
High Activity of Lactobacillus Acidophilus Milk
Soybean Milk Products Introduction

Research Stations

SUST has a total of 17 research laboratories, centers and institutes that seek to add to the scientific knowledge base across a diverse range of fields. The following are SUST's most active research stations:

Province-ministry Co-constructed Key Laboratory of Light Chemical Additives Chemistry and Technology

Established : November 18, 2008

This Lab focuses on studies which may be helpful in paper-making, leather-making, dyeing, and ceramics.

Shaanxi Key Laboratory of Paper-making Technology and Special Paper Product Development

Established : December 7, 1999

This Lab studies new paper - making technology and new paper products and make s a significant contribution to the development of the national paper industry.

Shaanxi Key Laboratory of Light Chemical Additives

Established : November 2, 2004

This Lab studies the light chemical additives technology and its role in paper-making, leather -making, ceramics, spinning and weaving.

Laboratory of Pulping and Paper-making Engineering

Established : December 25, 1998

In addition to its normal teaching experiments, this Lab also supports many important government and private enterprises. The Lab makes a significant contribution to the paper industry and northwest China 's economy.

Light Industry Machinery CAD/CAM Engineering Research Center

Established : December 25, 1998

Under the National Light Industry Bureau, this Research Center studies CAM mechanisms and CAM development techniques. CAM technology at SUST enjoys a good reputation in China and is now recognized by the same field in Japan, the United States and Italy, respectively.

Shaanxi Provincial Engineering Research Cent er of Flat Panel Display Technology

Established : August 3, 2006

This is an Institution for the study of panel displays. It includes seven laboratories and now undertakes 12 scientific programs, which add to its promising future.

Shaanxi Food Engineering Research Center

Established : February 5, 2004

This Research Center studies and develops new food-making technology and also introduces new products that are high-tech and consumer-friendly.

Shaanxi Traditional Chinese Medicine Research Center of Biotechnology

Established : July 26, 2001

This Research Center deals with the study and development of systematic traditional Chinese medicine on national and provincial levels and is also commissioned to work on projects for private enterprise. The Center deals with the study and development of systematic traditional Chinese medicine.

Shaanxi Provincial Light Industry Technology Innovation and Technology Service Center

Established : February 18, 2004

This Service Center aims to innovate new technology and new products, and i t offers help for many private enterprises. The Center also utilizes natural resources, other institutions of higher learning, and human resources in Shaanxi province that make a significant contribution to the Shaanxi's economic development.

Shaanxi Provincial Academy of Agricultural Products Processing Technology

This Academy is the center for agricultural products process es, light industry electromechanical device research and development, design, and development of light industry products. It is currently under construction.

Industrial Automation Institute (IAI)

Established: June 2009

Subordinated to SUST, this Institute mainly researches the process industry, engaged in the field of information integration and process, the development of industrial control systems, and applied technology.

New Materials Institute

This Institute aims at meeting the current and future market needs for light chemical materials by innovating ultrasound technology, supercritical technology, biotechnology and other high-tech additions into the research of new leather chemicals, paper chemicals, auxiliaries, fine chemicals, and food additives with advanced laboratory equipment.

Environment-friendly Paper-making Industry Institute

Established: 1988

This Institute mainly researches the biological treatment technologies for pulp and paper-making industry wastewater, including Alkali straw pulp, pulp and straw pulp CMP wastewater, waste paper pulp and semi-chemical pulping straw biological wastewater treatment technology, and the biological anaerobic wastewater treatment.

Logistics Engineering Institute

This Institute's main research involves logistics and distribution center design and planning, logistics demonstration, design, analysis and evaluation, logistics warehousing and transportation technology research, logistics information technology and simulation software development, logistics teaching and experimental research, and logistics training and logistics certification.

Faculty 
Chuanyi Wang - Distinguished Professor and Academic Dean in the School of Environmental Science and Engineering

References 

[1] https://web.archive.org/web/20101204101723/http://web.sust.edu.cn/oice/history.html

External links 
 Shaanxi University of Science and Technology
  Shaanxi University of Science and Technology 

Xi'an
Xianyang
Universities and colleges in Shaanxi
1958 establishments in China
Educational institutions established in 1958